The Presidential Secretariat (Sinhala: ජනාධිපති ලේකම් කාර්යාලය; janādhipati lēkam kāryālaya) is the office of the President of Sri Lanka. It provides the administrative and institutional framework for the exercise of the duties, responsibilities and powers vested in the President by the Constitution. The Presidential Secretariat is located in the Old Parliament Building in Colombo.

The head of the Presidential Secretariat is the Secretary to the President (also known as the President's Secretary), who is ex officio the most senior civil servant and head of the Sri Lanka Administrative Service. The current President's Secretary is Gamini Senarath. The post has its roots from the post of Secretary to the Governors of Ceylon and thereafter the Secretary to the Governor-General of Ceylon.

Duties
President's Office shall be concerned with the following aspects of governance:-

 Co-ordinating and reviewing the implementation of Government policy in all sectors;
 Monitoring progress in the implementation of specific projects and programmes;
 Addressing perceived public aspirations and grievances, and
 Maintaining a watching brief over the nation's external relations.

Divisions

The Presidential Secretariat includes the following Divisions:

Agency Co-ordination Unit (ACU)
Chief of Staff Division (COS)
Citizens Services and Grievance Response Division (CSGR)
Constitutional and Statutory Affairs Division (CSA)
Electronic Media Unit (EMU)
Establishment & Operations Division (E&O)
Establishment and Human Resources Development Unit (EHRDU)
Financial and Accounts Division (FAD)
Information and Communication Technology Unit (ICT)
Internal Administration Unit (IAU)
Internal Audit (IA)
Legal Affairs Unit (LAU)
Media Co-ordination Unit (MCU)
Photography and Video Unit (PVU)
Policy Co-ordination and Monitoring Division (PCM)
Policy Research & Information Unit (PRIU)
Presidential Investigation Unit (PIU)
President's Fund (PF)
Presidents Media Division (PMD)
Private Secretary's Division
Public Services Evaluation and Social Welfare Unit (PSESW)
Religious Affairs Unit (RAU)
Secretary Bureau (SB)
Special Projects Unit (SPU)
Strategy and Perception management Unit (SPMU)
Trade Union Unit (TU)

Statutory institutions

The following institutions fall within the purview of the Secretary to the President;
  Public Service Commission
 Judicial Service Commission
 Parliamentary Commissioner for Administration
 Board of Management for the Superior Courts Complex
 Cabinet Memoranda listed in the Agenda and Cabinet Conclusions
 Commission to Investigate Allegations of Bribery/Corruption
 Declarations of Assets and Liabilities

Presidential Secretaries
 W. M. P. B. Menikdiwela, SLAS (1979–1988)
 Prematilaka Mapitigama, SLAS (1988–1989) 
 K. H. J. Wijedasa  SLAS (1989–1994)
K. Balapatabendi, PC (1994–2003)
W. J. S. Karunaratne, SLAS (2003–2005)
Lalith Weeratunga, SLAS (2005–2015)
P.B. Abeykoon, SLAS (2015–2017)
Austin Fernando, SLAS (2017–2018)
Udaya Ranjith Seneviratne, SLAS (2018–2019)
P. B. Jayasundera (2019–2022)

2022 Sri Lankan protests
On 9 July 2022, during the 2022 Sri Lankan protests, thousands of protesters stormed and occupied President's House and the Presidential Secretariat, Temple Trees (Prime Minister's house) demanding that both president Gotabaya Rajapaksa and prime minister Ranil Wickremesinghe resign immediately.

See also
President of Sri Lanka
Prime Minister's Office
Sri Lanka Administrative Service

References

External links
 Presidential Secretariat
 The official Website of Presidential Secretariat of Sri Lanka

1978 establishments in Sri Lanka
Buildings and structures in Colombo
Government buildings in Sri Lanka
British colonial architecture in Sri Lanka